Grenville–Carleton was a federal electoral district represented in the House of Commons of Canada from 1968 to 1979. It was located in the province of Ontario. This riding was created in 1966 from parts of Carleton and Grenville—Dundas ridings.

It consisted of:

 the part of the City of Ottawa lying south of Base Line Road and west of Fisher Avenue;
 the Townships of Goulbourn, Marlborough, Nepean, North Gower and Osgoode, and Long Island (in the Township of Gloucester) in the County of Carleton;
 the County of Grenville, including the Village of Merrickville, and
 the Townships of Matilda and Mountain in the County of Dundas.

The electoral district was abolished in 1976 when it was redistributed between Leeds—Grenville, Nepean—Carleton, Ottawa Centre, Ottawa West-Nepean and Stormont—Dundas ridings.

Members of Parliament

This riding has elected the following Members of Parliament:

Election results

|}

|}

|}

See also 

 List of Canadian federal electoral districts
 Past Canadian electoral districts

External links 
Riding history from the Library of Parliament

Former federal electoral districts of Ontario